Enekbatus bounites is a shrub endemic to Western Australia.

It is found along the west coast on hilltops in the Mid West region of Western Australia between Geraldton and Northampton where it grows in clay soils over sandstone.

References

bounites
Endemic flora of Western Australia
Myrtales of Australia
Rosids of Western Australia
Vulnerable flora of Australia
Plants described in 2010
Taxa named by Barbara Lynette Rye
Taxa named by Malcolm Eric Trudgen